The 2002–03 Iraqi First Division was the 29th season of the competition since its establishment in 1974. Organised by the Iraq Football Association (IFA), the league's name was changed to Iraqi First Division, and it started on 6 September 2002. 27 rounds of the league were played before the US-led invasion of Iraq began on 20 March 2003. Despite the outbreak of the Iraq War, matches continued with free entry for spectators and games from rounds 28 and 29 were played in the midst of the conflict. The last matches were played on 28 March before the league stopped and Saddam Hussein's government was overthrown, leading to the formation of a new IFA committee.

The IFA revealed on 6 May that it was considering holding a play-off between the top four Baghdad clubs to decide who would qualify for the 2003 Arab Unified Club Championship. However, the IFA then announced on 30 May that Al-Shorta had been chosen to participate as they were leading the league table at the end of round 27 before the outbreak of war. The IFA later announced that the 2002–03 league competition had been cancelled and that the league table at the end of round 27 would also be used to determine the clubs that qualified for the 2003 Iraqi Elite Cup and the 2004 AFC Champions League.

League table used to determine qualifications

Results

Season statistics

Hat-tricks

Notes
4 Player scored 4 goals

References

External links
 Iraq Football Association

Iraqi Premier League seasons
1
Iraq